Dłużyna Górna  is a village in the administrative district of Gmina Pieńsk, within Zgorzelec County, Lower Silesian Voivodeship, in south-western Poland, close to the German border. Prior to 1945 it was in Germany.

The village has an approximate population of 400.

Gallery

References

Villages in Zgorzelec County